Herbert Sebastian Agar (29 September 1897 – 24 November 1980) was an American journalist and historian, and an editor of the Louisville Courier-Journal.

Early life
Herbert Sebastian Agar was born September 29, 1897 in New Rochelle, New York to John G. Agar and Agnes Louis Macdonough. He graduated from Columbia University in  1919 and received his master's degree from Princeton University in 1922 and Ph.D in 1924.

Career
Agar won the Pulitzer Prize for History in 1934 for his 1933 book The People's Choice, a critical look at the American presidency.  Agar was associated with the Southern Agrarians and edited, with Allen Tate, Who Owns America? (1936). He was also a strong proponent of an Americanized version of the British distributist socioeconomic system.

Agar's 1950 book The Price of Union was one of John F. Kennedy's favorite books, and he kept a copy of it on his desk. A passage from The Price of Union about an act of courage by John Quincy Adams gave Kennedy the idea of writing an article about senatorial courage. He showed the passage to his speechwriter Ted Sorensen and asked him to see if he could find some more examples. This Sorensen did, and eventually they had enough for a book, the Pulitzer Prize-winning Profiles in Courage (1956).

Personal life and death
On June 8, 1945 Agar married Barbara Wallace, the daughter of the architect Sir Edwin Lutyens and the widow of Euan Wallace, a former British Minister of Transport.

Agar died on November 24, 1980 in Sussex, England, where he lived since World War II.

Works
Milton and Plato (1928)
The People's Choice: From Washington to Harding — A Study in Democracy (1933) 
Land of the Free (1935)
Who Owns America? A New Declaration of Independence (contributor and co-editor with Allen Tate) (1936) 
The Pursuit of Happiness: The Story of American Democracy (1938)
A Time for Greatness (1942)
The Price of Union: The Influence of the American Temper on the Course of History (1950)
Abraham Lincoln (1952)
The Unquiet Years: U.S.A. 1945–1955 (1957)
The Price of Power: America Since 1945 (1957) 
The Saving Remnant: An Account of Jewish Survival Since 1914 (1960)
The Perils of Democracy (1965)
The Darkest Year: Britain Alone, June 1940 - June 1941 (1972)

References

1897 births
1980 deaths
Writers from New Rochelle, New York
Columbia University alumni
Editors of Kentucky newspapers
Princeton University alumni
Pulitzer Prize for History winners
Journalists from New York (state)
Courier Journal people
Historians from New York (state)
20th-century American journalists
American male journalists
Distributism